Hugh Wilson may refer to:

 Hugh Wilson (Presbyterian minister) (1794–1868), American Presbyterian missionary and minister
 Hugh Irvine Wilson (1879–1925), golf course architect
 Hugh R. Wilson (1885–1946), United States Ambassador to Germany, 1938
 Hugh E. Wilson (1899–1962), American college football, baseball and basketball coach
 Hugh Wilson (Northern Ireland politician) (1905–1998), Independent Unionist supporter
 Hugh Wilson (RAF officer) (1908–1990), British Royal Air Force officer
 Hugh Wilson (director) (1943–2018), American writer/director of film comedies (Police Academy) and creator/producer of TV series (WKRP in Cincinnati)
 Hugh Wilson (New Zealand botanist) (born 1945), New Zealand botanist
 Hugh Wilson (American botanist) (1943–2018), professor at Texas A&M University
 Hugh Wilson (cricketer) (born 1958), English cricketer
 Hugh Wilson (football manager), worked for Alloa Athletic FC and Cowdenbeath FC
 Hughie Wilson (1869–1940), Scottish footballer
 Hugh Wilson (Scottish footballer), Scottish international footballer
 Geoffrey Wilson (British politician) (Hugh Geoffrey Birch Wilson, 1903–1975), British politician, member of parliament from Truro